Săceni is a commune in Teleorman County, Muntenia, Romania. It is composed of three villages: Butculești, Ciurari and Săceni.

References

Communes in Teleorman County
Localities in Muntenia